La Herradura Formation is a sedimentary formation of Lower Cretaceous age exposed near Lima in Peru. The sediments of the formation reflect a marine near-shore depositional environment.

References

Geologic formations of Peru
Lower Cretaceous Series of South America
Cretaceous Peru
Hauterivian Stage